Arie Haviv is a former Israeli footballer of Tunisian Jewish descent.

References

1956 births
Living people
Israeli footballers
Israel international footballers
Hapoel Yehud F.C. players
Hapoel Kfar Saba F.C. players
Maccabi Netanya F.C. players
Hapoel Haifa F.C. players
Beitar Tel Aviv F.C. players
Israeli people of Tunisian-Jewish descent
Association football goalkeepers